Libertia paniculata is a plant in the family Iridaceae. It is endemic to Australia, where it occurs in Queensland, New South Wales and Victoria.

References

paniculata
Asparagales of Australia
Flora of Queensland
Flora of New South Wales
Flora of Victoria (Australia)
Plants described in 1810
Taxa named by Robert Brown (botanist, born 1773)